Hyposmocoma alliterata is a species of moth of the family Cosmopterigidae. It was first described by Lord Walsingham in 1907. It is endemic to the Hawaiian islands of Oahu, Molokai, Maui and Hawaii. This species is thought to range from the lowlands to the highlands, where it is most abundant.

The larvae feed amongst lichens on trees trunks of Acacia koa, Aleurites moluccanus, Boehmeria, Manihot glaziovii, Prosopis and Sophora. Its larvae are at times common on the trunks of living trees.

External links

alliterata
Endemic moths of Hawaii
Moths described in 1907
Taxa named by Thomas de Grey, 6th Baron Walsingham